Lake Hall is a small lake located in central Leon County, Florida, United States. It is located just north of Interstate 10 and slightly west of U.S. Highway 319 and within Tallahassee city limits.

Lake Hall forms the south, western, and part of the northern boundaries of Alfred B. Maclay Gardens State Park and is home to Capitol City Rowing. The other shores of Lake Hall are lined with private property and private homes.

Hydrology 
Lake Hall is classified as an oligotrophic lake and has the distinction of having the best water quality of all lakes in Leon County according to TAPP, a local water quality and conservation group. Due to its clarity, the lake is suspected to be spring fed although no connection has been found to the Floridan Aquifer via a sinkhole.

The lake supports beds of Vallisneria americana and Sagittaria stagnorum but contains no hydrilla. Some hydrilla was discovered in the southern lobe of the lake and grass carp were introduced to control the plant.

Fish found in Lake Hall include largemouth bass, bluegills bream, Crappie, Brown Bullhead Catfish, Channel Catfish, and Yellow Bullhead Catfish.

Lake Hall is also home to the swim portion of the Redhills Sprint Triathlon.

References

External links
Tallahassee Visitors Guide
TAPP - Lake Hall
Alfred B. Maclay Gardens State Park

Hall
Geography of Tallahassee, Florida
Hall